Eduard Vorganov (born 7 December 1982) is a Russian professional road bicycle racer, who last rode for UCI Continental team . In 2012, Vorganov won the Russian National Road Race Championships.

On 5 February 2016, he was suspended for a positive test of meldonium in a drug test conducted on 14 January. His provisional suspension was lifted in May 2016, as evidence emerged that athletes who had taken meldonium before January 1, the date the ban started, could have tested positive after the fact. In December 2016, Vorganov joined the  team for the 2017 season.

Major results

2004
 1st Overall Circuit des Ardennes
1st Stage 4
 1st Memorial Oleg Dyachenko
 5th Overall Tour de Normandie
 8th Overall Grand Prix de la Somme
 8th Grand Prix de la Ville de Lillers
 8th Tour de Vendée
 9th Overall Circuit de Lorraine
2005
 1st Overall Five Rings of Moscow
 3rd Overall Okolo Slovenska
 3rd Memorial Oleg Dyachenko
 4th E.O.S. Tallinn GP
2006
 3rd Mayor Cup
 4th Five Rings of Moscow
 4th Boucle de l'Artois
 4th Memorial Oleg Dyachenko
 6th Overall Course de Solidarność et des Champions Olympiques
 10th Tro-Bro Léon
2007
 2nd Clásica de Almería
2008
 5th Overall GP CTT Correios de Portugal
 10th Overall Vuelta a La Rioja
2010
 7th Overall Tour Down Under
 10th Trofeo Deià
 10th Trofeo Magaluf-Palmanova
2011
 2nd Road race, National Road Championships
2012
 1st  Road race, National Road Championships
 10th Overall Tour Down Under
 10th GP Miguel Induráin
2015
 1st Prologue (TTT) Tour of Austria
2017
 2nd Overall Tour of Mersin
 3rd Overall Tour of Ankara
 4th Overall Tour d'Azerbaïdjan
 9th Overall Tour of Bulgaria South
2018
 1st Overall Tour of Mersin
1st Mountains classification
1st Stage 3
 2nd Memoriał Henryka Łasaka
 4th Overall Tour of Cartier
 5th Overall Five Rings of Moscow
 7th Overall Tour of Xingtai
 8th Overall Tour of China I

Grand Tour general classification results timeline

See also
List of doping cases in cycling

References

External links

 Eduard Vorganov's Profile on Team Katusha

Russian male cyclists
Living people
1982 births
Sportspeople from Voronezh
Russian sportspeople in doping cases
Doping cases in cycling